Félix-Alexandre Desruelles was a French sculptor who was born in Valenciennes in 1865. He was runner up for the Prix de Rome in 1891, won the Prix national des Salons in 1897 and a Gold Medal at l'Exposition Universelle in 1900. He died in La Flèche in 1943. He was a member of the Institut de France and of the Académie des Beaux-Arts.

War memorials

Other works

Notes

 In the 6th arrondissement of Paris, just by the Saint-Germain-des-Prés church, there is a small public park named after Desruelles, the Square Félix Desruelles. It is here that one can see "La Fontaine pastorale" - see above.
 A photograph of the 1887 work "Pastorale", a high-relief in plaster, is one of several photographs in an album of works purchased by the State from the "Service des Beaux-Arts. Salon de 1897"

References

External links
 

1865 births
1943 deaths
People from Valenciennes
Members of the Académie des beaux-arts
20th-century French sculptors
19th-century French sculptors
French male sculptors
19th-century French male artists